Sohrab Pournazeri is an Iranian musician and composer. He plays Kamancheh and Tanbour.

Career
Sohrab Pournazeri currently plays with Shams Ensemble which was established in 1980 and is focused on Persian classical music. Pournazeri's primary performance instruments are Kamancheh and Tanbour.

Soundtrack Composition 

 Flaming directed by Hamid Nematollah 2018 
 Subdued directed by Hamid Nematollah 2015 
 Heavy Makeup directed by Hamid Nematollah 2014 
 Astigmatism directed by Majid-Reza Mostafavi 2018 
 Vaziat-e Sefid directed by Hamid Nematollah 2012 
 Penniless directed by Hamid Nematollah 2009

Discography

Live Performances
 2021: Sohrab Pournazeri and Sahar Boroujerdi at Pierre Boulez Saal
2021: Festival International de Musique Nouvelle en Franche Comtè at Château de Ray-sur-Saône, France
2021: Sohrab Pournazeri and Ernest Production at Les Dominicains de Haute-Alsace, France
2020: Shamss Ensemble and Homayoun Shajarian at Theatre de la Ville, Paris, France
2020: Bozar Music Festival, Shamss Ensemble and Homayoun Shajarian at Palais des Beaux-Arts, Brussels, Belgium
2019: Iran-e Man Concert Tour in Canada (Toronto Meridian Hall, L’Olympia de Montréal, Queen Elizabeth Theatre, Jack Singer Concert Hall)
2019: Iran-e Man Concert Tour in Europe (Gothenburg Concert Hall, Stockholm Concert Hall, Central Hall, The Plaza, Großer Sendesaal des Hessischen Rundfunks, Capitol Theater) 
2019: Iran-e Man Concert Tour in USA (City National Civic, Warner Theater, Cullen Performance Hall, Microsoft Theater) 
2019: Farhang Foundation Nowruz Concert (Homayoun Shajarian, Sohrab Pournazeri and Pacific Symphony) 
2019: Sohrab Pournazeri & Homayoun Sakhi at Theatre de la Ville, Paris, France
2018: Homayoun Shajarian, Tahmoures & Sohrab Pournazeri at Cemal Reşit Rey (CRR) Concert Hall, Istanbul, Turkey
2018: Shamss Ensemble at FEZ Music Festival, Jnan sbil, Fes, Morocco 
2018: Shamss Ensemble at Konya Mystic Music Festival, Konya, Turkey 
2018: Iran-e Man Concert Tour in Canada (Palais des congrès de Montréal, Sony Centre for the Performing Arts - Meridian Hall, Queen Elizabeth Theatre, Arts Commons)
2017: Iran-e Man Concert Tour in Iran (Ministry of Interior Hall)
2017: C Project (30 Nights at Sa'dabad Complex)
2017: Performance at Au Fil Des Voix with Nishtiman Ensemble 
2016: Forde Festival with Nishtiman Ensemble 
2011: USA tour with Shams Ensemble
 2010: Omar Khayyám project with Alireza Ghorbani, Dorsaf Hamdani and Ali Ghamsari

References

External links 
 Official Website

People from Kermanshah
Iranian Kurdish people
Musicians from Kermanshah
Iranian kamancheh players
Iranian setar players
Iranian tar players
Living people
Year of birth missing (living people)